Tommy Edison (born July 17, 1963) is an American YouTuber, radio presenter and film critic known for his blindness and self-deprecating sense of humor in his internet presence. From 1994 until 2013 he worked as a traffic reporter for the station Star 99.9 in Bridgeport, Connecticut.

Although he had never driven a car or seen a traffic jam, as a traffic reporter he used what he heard about traffic on police scanners and in calls with listeners on the road.

Motivated to review films by his frustration with their visual language, he started a YouTube channel called Blind Film Critic with his friend Ben Churchill in 2011. His reviews focus on script, music and sound effects. The first film he reviewed was Scream 4; his favorites include Hugo, Goodfellas, Clerks and American Hustle. In 2013, audio description allowed him to watch his first silent film, which he joked was "eye-opening"—however, he does not use it when preparing his reviews. He was endorsed by Roger Ebert in 2011, and has been featured on The Howard Stern Show and CNN. He also made videos answering viewers' questions about blindness on another channel entitled The Tommy Edison Experience, and has covered topics such as dreams, colors, Braille and assistive technology.

Early life and career
Edison was born completely blind, and was born with an underdeveloped optic nerve. He was born and raised in Greenwich, Connecticut, and attended Canterbury School and the University of Bridgeport, where he studied music. He has credited his parents for treating him the same as his sighted sisters during his upbringing. His mother went to great lengths to make sure Tommy was put into a normal class rather than the school recommended special education class, stating "Tommy has a normal Cognitive Function, He is normal just like the other students, he just so happens to be blind." After developing an interest in local and New York radio stations, he was hired as a disc jockey for the station WJAZ in Stamford, Connecticut in 1987, becoming its traffic reporter two years later.

In 2016 he and his producer Ben Churchill moved to the Los Angeles area and began the next phase in his career as a public figure.

References

External links

 

1963 births
American film critics
American radio personalities
American YouTubers
American blind people
Canterbury School (Connecticut) alumni
Living people